Ricardo Cardoso Guimarães (born 4 October 1959), commonly known as  Cadum , is a Brazilian former professional basketball player and coach.

Professional playing career
During his pro club career, Cadum won 5 Brazilian Championships, in the seasons 1982, 1985, 1986 (I), 1986 (II), 1987. He won all of the Brazilian championships as a member of C.A. Monte Líbano.

National team playing career
With the senior Brazilian national basketball team, Cadum competed at the following major world tournaments: the 1980 Summer Olympics, the 1982 FIBA World Cup, the 1984 Summer Olympics, the 1988 Summer Olympics, the 1990 FIBA World Cup, and the 1992 Summer Olympics.

Coaching career
After his basketball playing career ended, Cadum began a career working as a basketball coach.

References

External links
 

1959 births
Living people
Brazilian basketball coaches
Brazilian men's basketball players
1982 FIBA World Championship players
1990 FIBA World Championship players
Basketball players at the 1980 Summer Olympics
Basketball players at the 1984 Summer Olympics
Basketball players at the 1988 Summer Olympics
Basketball players at the 1992 Summer Olympics
Clube Atlético Monte Líbano basketball players
Esporte Clube Pinheiros basketball players
Esporte Clube Sírio basketball players
Flamengo basketball players
Olympic basketball players of Brazil
Point guards
Shooting guards
Sociedade Esportiva Palmeiras basketball players
Basketball players from São Paulo
Unitri/Uberlândia basketball coaches
Unitri/Uberlândia basketball players